Mbanguingar Krabe (25 January 1971) is a former Chadian professional football player. He made eight appearances for the Chad national football team.

See also
 List of Chad international footballers

References

External links
 

1971 births
Living people
Chadian footballers
Chad international footballers
Place of birth missing (living people)
Association footballers not categorized by position